Trivalve  (foaled 1924) was an Australian race horse that won the 1927 Melbourne Cup.

Racing career

In 1927 Trivalve was successful in the AJC Derby, Victoria Derby and the Melbourne Cup. The win in the Cup gave trainer James Scobie and jockey Bobbie Lewis their fourth Melbourne Cup successes. Trivalve won career prize money of £28,375.

Stud career

Trivalve was retired to stud but proved an unsuccessful sire failing to sire any stakes winners. Trivalve was eventually sold on as a station sire and reportedly died of snakebite in the Northern Territory in 1941, having been sold twice that year for 7 guineas and 9 guineas.

Pedigree

References 

Racehorses bred in Australia
Racehorses trained in Australia
1924 racehorse births
Victoria Derby winners
Melbourne Cup winners